This is a chronological list of expeditions to the International Space Station (ISS). An expedition to the ISS refers to the crew that is occupying the space station and using it for research and testing. Expeditions can last up to six months and include between two and seven crew members. 

Expeditions are numbered starting from one and sequentially increased with each expedition. Resupply mission crews and space tourists are excluded (see List of human spaceflights to the ISS for details). ISS commanders are listed in italics. "Duration" is the period of time between the crew's launch from Earth and until their decoupling from the ISS.

Future international collaboration on ISS activities has been thrown into doubt by the 2022 Russian invasion of Ukraine and related sanctions on Russia.

Completed expeditions

Current expedition

Future expeditions

See also 
 List of human spaceflights to the ISS
 List of International Space Station crew
 List of International Space Station visitors
 List of Mir Expeditions
 List of ESA space expeditions
 List of commanders of the ISS

Notes

References

Citations

Sources 
 General references

 NASA's space station crew page
 SpaceFacts
 NASA ISS Expedition Mission News releases

 
ISS
International Space Station expeditions